Kensington is a Canadian town located in Prince County, Prince Edward Island. In 2021, its population was 1,812.

History 
The area was first known as Five Lanes End, as roads from five different communities converged at the point. It was renamed Barrett's Cross in 1824 after an early settler who established an inn in the area. In 1862, the town was renamed after Kensington Palace in London and it became a town after the Prince Edward Island Railway's mainline from Charlottetown to Summerside curved through the community.  The town's former railyards are now rehabilitated as a tourist venue, with the former Kensington Railway Station designed by architect Charles Benjamin Chappell designated a National Historic Site of Canada in 1976.

Demographics 

Events 
Aside from being a service centre for the surrounding farming areas, Kensington hosts many notable events throughout the year. These include the Kensington Harvest Festival, Miss Community Gardens pageant, and many more.

Education 
Kensington has schools from Preschool to Secondary. It is part of the English Language School Board (formerly part of the Western School Board) District of schools. At the Preschool level there are numerous organizations such as Fun Times Kindergarten, Play School, Happy Days Playschool, and Kiddietown Day Care.

Kensington has one elementary school, Queen Elizabeth Elementary. Opened on December 3, 1976, Queen Elizabeth teaches kindergarten through grade 6. The school has two playgrounds, the front playground being used for the primary grades and the back playground for grades 4 through 6. The school contains a music room, gymnasium, French room, and library. Many extracurricular activities are offered to students, such as intramurals, choir, chess club, photography club and more.

It is also home to Kensington Intermediate Senior High School which teaches grades seven to twelve. KISH (as it is often abbreviated) offers many extracurricular programs and organizations such as the Gender Sexuality Alliance, the student council, sports teams (e.g. rugby, soccer, basketball and more), Travel and Tourism, Agriculture (known commonly as Aggies), concert and jazz band and much more.

References

External links

Communities in Prince County, Prince Edward Island
Towns in Prince Edward Island
Populated places established in 1824